Maxine Ella Brown (born August 18, 1939) is an American soul and R&B singer.

Background and career
Maxine Brown began singing as a child, performing with two New York City based gospel groups called the Angelairs and the Royaltones when she was a teenager. In 1960, she signed with the small Nomar record label, who released the deep soul ballad "All in My Mind" (which was written by Brown) late in the year. The single became a hit, climbing to number two on the US Billboard R&B chart (number 19 pop), and it was quickly followed by "Funny", which peaked at number three.

Brown was poised to become a star and she moved to the bigger ABC-Paramount in 1962, but left the label after an unsuccessful year and recording several non-chart singles for the label, and signed to the New York-based uptown soul label, Wand Records, a Scepter Records subsidiary, in 1963.

Brown recorded a string of sizable hits for Wand over the next three years. Among these were the Carole King/Gerry Goffin songs "Oh No Not My Baby", which reached number 24 on the pop chart in 1964, and "It's Gonna Be Alright", which peaked at No. 26 on the R&B chart the following year. She also recorded duets with label-mate Chuck Jackson, including a reworked version of an Alvin Robinson hit, "Something You Got", which climbed to No. 10 on the R&B chart. However, the company turned its focus to other bigger-selling acts, especially Dionne Warwick.

All backing vocals for Brown's records were performed by Cissy Houston and the Sweet Inspirations (the same group that backed Elvis Presley), plus emerging writer-producers Nick Ashford and Valerie Simpson. Hoping to increase the line of hits for Brown and her singing partner, Chuck Jackson, Ashford and Simpson took their song catalog to Scepter Records looking for a deal. When they were turned down, the couple approached Berry Gordy at Motown Records who immediately hired them. Songs that were penned for Brown and Jackson became blockbuster hits for Ray Charles, such as "Let's Go Get Stoned" (co-written by Jo Armstead), as well as Marvin Gaye and Tammi Terrell's "Ain't No Mountain High Enough".

In 1969, Brown left Wand Records for Commonwealth United, where she recorded two singles, the first "We'll Cry Together" reached No. 10 in the Billboard R&B chart and also made the lower reaches of the Hot 100. A spell with Avco Records followed, but her later recordings generally met with little commercial success.

Discography

Hit singles

Note
* no R&B charts published during these chart runs

Albums
Maxine Brown – 1961
The Fabulous Sound of Maxine Brown – 1962
Maxine Brown, Irma Thomas & Ronnie Dickerson – 1964
Spotlight on Maxine Brown – 1964
Maxine Brown's Greatest Hits [LP] – 1967
Out of Sight - 1968
We'll Cry Together – 1969
Blue Ribbon Country, Vol. 1 – 1975
One in a Million – 1984
Like Never Before – 1985
Oh No Not My Baby: The Best of Maxine Brown – 1990

References

External links
Maxine Brown Official Site

1939 births
Living people
20th-century American women singers
ABC Records artists
20th-century African-American women singers
American soul singers
Northern soul musicians
People from Kingstree, South Carolina
Scepter Records artists
Wand Records artists
Avco Records artists
20th-century American singers
21st-century African-American people
21st-century African-American women